Brachmia insuavis is a moth in the family Gelechiidae. It was described by Edward Meyrick in 1914. It is found in Taiwan.

References

Moths described in 1914
Brachmia
Taxa named by Edward Meyrick
Moths of Taiwan